The Highland Arts Theatre Chime is a bell chime in the Highland Arts Theatre in Sydney, Cape Breton Regional Municipality, Nova Scotia, Canada. It consists of ten bells located in the south bell tower that are still in use today.

History
Work was commenced on the new church building on Bentinck Street on April 14, 1910. The cornerstone was laid by Mrs. Farquharson, widow of the second minister, on the 29th day of June.

As the old church had only a bell, it was decided by the members, that they would like to have chimes in the new church, so on January 18, 1910, before the new building had been started, a number of young ladies of St. Andrew's met at the home of Mrs. A. N. Maclennan, for the purpose of organizing a sewing league to raise money for the chimes. The group was organized under the name of "The Chimes Club." The Club met every Tuesday evening, the dues were 10c per month.

The sum of $225.46 was raised by these ladies by the end of the first year, by a sale of hand work, and two socials, at which admission was charged.  The contract price of the chimes was $3,500.00.

The bells were cast in bronze (bell metal) for St. Andrew's Church by the McShane Bell Foundry in Baltimore, Maryland, USA and are dated 1911. The chime first rang out in a series of concerts on June 24, 25, 26, 1911 in conjunction with the opening and dedication of the church itself.  The special chimer for the occasion was Prof. J. W. Mettee, representing the founders - The McShane Bell Co.

Characteristics

The bells are arranged as a traditional chime of 10 bells and are played from the ringing room immediately below the Bell Chamber in the bell tower using the original unmodified McShane "pump handle" chimestand with deep key-fall on all notes. Nine of the bells are hung fixed in position in the main chime frame in the belfry, the tenth, the heaviest bell, is mounted in a rotary iron yoke on iron stands above the main chime frame.  This bell, the tenor bell, is equipped with both a spring clapper and a tolling hammer so can be played either by swing chiming or by using the chimestand.

All the bells have the foundry's name cast onto their waist. The nine smaller bells are also decorated with inscriptions, quotes from Psalms from the King James Version of the Bible, cast onto their waist, while the largest bell's inscription reads "St. Andrews Church, Sydney NS". The chime is attuned to concert pitch, to the eight notes of the octave or diatonic scale with two bells added, one bell a semitone, a flat seventh, and one bell, the treble bell, above the octave.

Internet meme
In December 2015 a video posted on Facebook of Sydney native Glenda Watt playing the Christmas carol "Angels We Have Heard on High" on the chime was viewed more than 1.6 million times within the first nine days of it being uploaded to the social networking site.

Follow this link to a page of videos of the chime being played: The Chimes ~ Christmas Music

The bells and their inscriptions

All bells are inscribed "MC SHANE BELL FOUNDRY CO., BALTIMORE, MD., 1911" on their waist.

Total weight of bells

Chimers

 Fred MacQuarrie
 James C. P. Fraser (later to become a minister)
 Percy Shaw
 James Menzies
 Dan Walker
 Fred Morrison
 Edwin Boutilier
 Cyril Everett
 John Campbell
 Clifford Boutilier
 Robert Crooks Jr.
 Ronald Crooks
 Robert Watt
 Donald Hill
 Lourie Hill
 Grant Kerr
 Sandy MacDonald
 Glenda Watt since 2013

Gallery

References

External links
 Official Highland Arts Theatre Site
 McShane Bell Foundry website
 

Bells (percussion)
Bell towers
Bell towers in Canada
Arts centres in Canada
Theatres in Nova Scotia
Music venues in Nova Scotia
Buildings and structures in the Cape Breton Regional Municipality
Tourist attractions in Cape Breton County
Former churches in Canada